Draycott and Church Wilne is a civil parish in the Borough of Erewash district of Derbyshire, England.  The parish contains 17 listed buildings that are recorded in the National Heritage List for England.  Of these, one is listed at Grade I, the highest of the three grades, and the others are at Grade II, the lowest grade.  The parish contains the village of Draycott, the hamlet of Church Wilne, and the surrounding countryside.  Most of the listed buildings are mill buildings in Draycott village, and the others consist of houses and associated structures, a church, a milepost, and three railway bridges.


Key

Buildings

References

Citations

Sources

 

Lists of listed buildings in Derbyshire